Recreational diver training is the process of developing knowledge and understanding of the basic principles, and the skills and procedures for the use of scuba equipment so that the diver is able to dive for recreational purposes with acceptable risk using the type of equipment and in similar conditions to those experienced during training.

Not only is the underwater environment hazardous but the diving equipment itself can be dangerous. There are problems that divers must learn to avoid and manage when they do occur.  Divers need repeated practice and a gradual increase in challenge to develop and internalise the skills needed to control the equipment, to respond effective if they encounter difficulties, and to build confidence in their equipment and themselves. Diver practical training starts with simple but essential procedures, and builds on them until complex procedures can be managed effectively. This may be broken up into several short training programmes, with certification issued for each stage, or combined into a few more substantial programmes with certification issued when all the skills have been mastered.

Many diver training organizations exist, throughout the world, offering diver training leading to certification: the issuing of a "diving certification card," also known as a "C-card," or qualification card. This diving certification model originated at Scripps Institution of Oceanography in 1952 after two divers died while using university-owned equipment and the SIO instituted a system where a card was issued after training as evidence of competence. Diving instructors affiliated to a diving certification agency may work independently or through a university, a dive club, a dive school or a dive shop.  They will offer courses that should meet, or exceed, the standards of the certification organization that will certify the divers attending the course. The International Organization for Standardization has approved six recreational diving standards that may be implemented worldwide, and some of the standards developed by the (United States) RSTC are consistent with the applicable ISO Standards:

The initial open water training for a person who is medically fit to dive and a reasonably competent swimmer is relatively short. Many dive shops in popular holiday locations offer courses intended to teach a novice to dive in a few days, which can be combined with diving on the vacation. Other instructors and dive schools will provide more thorough training, which generally takes longer. Dive operators, dive shops, and cylinder filling stations may refuse to allow uncertified people to dive with them, hire diving equipment or have their diving cylinders filled. This may be an agency standard, company policy, or specified by legislation.

Types of training 
Most recreational diver training is for certification purposes, but a significant amount is for non-certification purposes such as introductory scuba experience, refresher training, and regional orientation. Mainstream recreational diver training starts with an entry-level course, focused on the skills of operating the equipment safely, which is intended to be followed by further training focused on the environment and other skills, but many recreational divers never progress further than their entry level certification, and may not dive often enough to maintain the basic skills learned on the course. Refresher courses are offered by many diving schools to remedy this possible loss of competence due to lack of practice.

Entry-level

The entry-level course is for certification of competence to dive in open water to a limited depth and not incurring a decompression obligation requiring decompression stops, so that the diver can make a direct ascent to the surface at any time at an acceptable level of risk. Entry level training does not generally require the diver to be competent to rescue another diver, though some training in sharing breathing gas is standard, and divers are expected to dive in the company of a dive buddy of equivalent certification.

Refresher courses
In principle a refresher course could be a checkout at any certification level, and could cover either or both skills and knowledge, but in practice the most common refresher courses are offered for the divers most likely to need one, which are entry level divers with little experience and a long gap since their last dive. Both PADI and SSI offer and recommend standardised refresher courses for these divers as a safer way of getting back into the water after a long break. They almost always include a confined water skill practice session, and may include an open water dive. Some schools expect the diver to revise the theory as well. This would typically be on-line, but there may be a live discussion and feedback session.

Further training
Further training is focused on skills associated with the environment and equipment (specialty courses), safety and mutual assistance (Rescue diver), dive planning, dive group leadership (Dive leader) and training other divers (Diving instructor). Some training providers require or encourage the diver to gain experience at their current level between training programmes, others are willing to enroll the diver on the next course as soon as they are available to start.

Dive leadership training

Dive leader describes the minimum requirements for dive leader training and certification for recreational scuba divers in international standard ISO 24801-3 and the equivalent European Standard EN 14153-3. Various organizations offer training that meets the requirements of the dive leader standard. Some agencies use the title "Dive Leader" for their equivalent certification, but several other titles are also used, "Divemaster" may be the most widespread, but "Dive Supervisor" is also used, and should not be confused with the very different status and responsibilities of a professional diving supervisor. CMAS affiliates certifications which meet the requirements of CMAS 3-star diver should meet the standard by default.

Scuba dive leaders are considered competent to plan, organise and conduct dives and to lead other recreational divers on open water dives, and for specialised recreational scuba diving activities for which they have been trained. They are also considered competent to conduct emergency procedures associated with these activities and the relevant diving environment. They may require orientation for unfamiliar local environmental conditions. Additional specialised training and experience is required to lead divers on more demanding dives.

The term is also used by BSAC for a specific certification.

Recreational diving instructor training

Minimum requirements to attend a recreational diving instructor training programme vary between certification agencies. The requirements for PADI Instructor Development Course (IDC) are 6 months as a certified diver, Registration as a PADI Divemaster, with 60 logged dives, a medical statement that the applicant does not suffer from a disqualifying medical condition and recent participation in PADI Emergency First Response training. The IDC takes five to seven days, and comprises two parts, Assistant Instructor training and Open Water Scuba Instructor training. During the IDC the candidate will learn PADI Standards and Procedures, The PADI system of instruction, diver safety and risk management, The role of the diving instructor in the recreational diving industry, and marketing and sales counseling for recreational diving business. 100 logged dives are required before the applicant can take the two-day Instructor Examination. PADI puts more emphasis on the business side of recreational diving than most other organisations.

Technical diving training

Technical diving is legally a type of recreational diving, but generally requires significantly greater competence to manage the higher risks of the environment, equipment and physiological challenges chosen by the technical diver. Errors and malfunctions that may be merely inconvenient in shallow open-water recreational dives within the no-decompression limits, may be rapidly fatal in overhead or deep, staged decompression dives. The necessary level of understanding of the principles, hazards and possible consequences, and the skills and procedures for managing the equipment and foreseeable contingencies is commensurately greater.

Training providers
Many diver training organizations exist, throughout the world, offering diver training leading to certification: the issuing of a "diver certification card," also known as a "C-card," or qualification card. This diver certification model originated at Scripps Institution of Oceanography in 1952 after two divers died while using university-owned equipment and the SIO instituted a system where a card was issued after training as evidence of competence.

Diving instructors affiliated to a diving certification agency may work independently or through a university, a dive club, a dive school or a dive shop.  They will offer courses that should meet, or exceed, the standards of the certification organization that will certify the divers attending the course.

Duration of training
Recreational diver training courses range from minor specialties which require one classroom session and an open water dive, and which may be completed in a day, to complex specialties which may take several days to weeks, and require several classroom sessions, confined water skills training and practice, and a substantial number of open-water dives, followed by rigorous assessment of knowledge and skills. Details on the approximate duration of training can be found on the websites of most certification agencies, but accurate schedules are generally only available from the specific school or instructor who will present that course, as this will depend on the local conditions and other constraints.

The initial open water training for a person who is medically fit to dive and a reasonably competent swimmer is relatively short. Many dive shops in popular holiday locations offer courses intended to teach a novice to dive in a few days, which can be combined with diving on the vacation. Other instructors and dive schools will provide more thorough training, which generally takes longer.

Location of training lessons 
Initial training typically takes place in three environments:
 Classroom - where material is presented and reviewed. This may be partially or wholly substituted by on-line learning, which may include on-line assessment.
 Confined water (Swimming pool or equivalent natural body of water) - where skills are taught by demonstration and initially practiced.
 Open water - where the learner demonstrates and refines the skills he or she has learned in an environment reasonably similar to the expected actual diving environment, and gains some experience of realistic conditions in a typical diving environment.

The usual sequence for learning most diving skills is to be taught the theory in the classroom, be shown the skills and practice them in a swimming pool or sheltered and shallow open water using the minimum equipment, then practice again in open water under supervision in full equipment and only then use the skill on real dives. Typically, early open water training takes place in a local body of water such as a lake, a flooded quarry or a sheltered and shallow part of the sea. Advanced training mostly takes place at depths and locations similar to the diver's normal diving environment.

Training topics 

Most entry-level training is similar across the diver training agencies, although some may emphasize certain topics earlier in the program, such as the inclusion of diver rescue in syllabuses such as CMAS 1* and NAUI, and its absence from other equivalent courses such as PADI Open Water Diver.

Many of the skills listed below are not included in entry level training, and where they are it may be only a subset of the range of skills in that category.
 Basic diving theory:
 Diving physics
 Scuba equipment
 Physiology of diving
 Diving hazards and precautions
 Diving signals
 Buddy system
 Basic water skills:
 Finning and mobility in-water
 Fitting and clearing a diving mask
 Snorkeling
 Shallow freediving
 Entering and exiting the water (seated entry, ladder exit, giant step entry, etc.)
 Basic open circuit scuba equipment skills:
 Preparing the scuba equipment
 Pre-dive checks:
Buddy check
 Water entries and exits with scuba gear
 Breathing from scuba equipment
 Buoyancy control, trim and stability using weights, the buoyancy compensator and the lungs
 Underwater mobility and maneuvering
 Ascents and descents
 Diving mask clearing
 Demand valve clearing and recovery
 Air sharing
 Emergency ascents
 Controlled emergency swimming ascent
 Assisted ascent
 Basic rebreather diving skills:
 Preparing the Rebreather
 Buoyancy control using the Rebreather
 Ascents and descents
 Diving mask clearing and mouthpiece draining
 Bailing out to an alternative breathing gas supply
 Bail-out ascent
 Diluent flush
 Dive planning skills:
 Buddy system
 Use of decompression tables
 Use of Dive computers
 Breathing gas requirement calculations
 Dive risk assessment:
 Safe dive site selection
 Choosing appropriate equipment
 Precautions for night diving and drift diving
 Solo diving
 Dive monitoring and management skills:
 Depth and time discipline
 Air management
 Use of surface marker buoys
 Use of decompression buoys
 Use of distance lines
 Use of diving shots
 Compass navigation
 Underwater pilotage
 Doing decompression stops
 Diver rescue techniques:
 Controlled buoyant lift
 Towing a diver and landing a casualty
 In-water artificial respiration
 CPR on land
 Oxygen first aid on land
 General First aid
 Technical diving techniques:
 Using Nitrox as a bottom gas
 Analyzing proportion of oxygen in a breathing gas
 Calculating maximum operating depth of a breathing gas
 Calculating equivalent air depth of a breathing gas
 Using Nitrox as a decompression gas
 Planning accelerated decompression stops
 Normoxic Trimix as a bottom gas
 Hypoxic Trimix as a bottom gas
 Special interest knowledge and skills:
 Cave diving techniques
 Wreck penetration
 Underwater photography
 Underwater videography
 Underwater archeology
 Marine life identification
 Marine biology
 Underwater search and recovery skills
 Selecting dive sites using nautical charts
 Tides and use of tide tables
 Weather influences and prediction
 Dive group leading skills:
 Group diver rescue management techniques
 Dive group safety, accident prevention and supervision
 Underwater survey skills
 Logistical skills:
 Boat handling and seamanship
 Boat navigation and position fixing
 Diving air compressor operation
 Gas blending
 Use of group equipment such as diving shots and decompression trapezes
 Recompression chamber operation
 Instructor skills:
 Teaching diving theory
 Teaching personal diving skills
 Teaching group diving, safety and rescue skills
 Teaching boat handling, seamanship and navigation skills
 Teaching instructing skills

Scuba training for younger people 

Most training agencies have minimum ages for diving and often restrict younger children to snorkeling. BSAC allows 6-year-olds to train for the "Dolphin Snorkeller" grade.

From the age of 8 years old PADI has the "SEAL Team program" and SSI have "SCUBA Rangers"  which teach diving in shallow swimming pools.

PADI allows 10-year-olds to do the full Open Water Diver course. They are called "Junior Open Water" divers. There are restrictions on their depth and group size when diving. Also they must dive with their parents or a professional. When they reach the age of 12 they can dive with a qualified adult. Over 15 they are considered capable of diving with others of the same age or above.

BSAC allows 12-year-olds to do the full entry level diving course - the Ocean Diver course. This qualification has no restrictions for the young diver, but individual branches of BSAC are free to set their own minimum age for branch membership.

The Society for Pediatric Sports Medicine (German: Gesellschaft für Pädiatrische Sportmedizin) has developed a consensus statement on the subject of children's diving in the 'Children's Diving' working group, which was presented to the public as the 'Eisenacher Erklärung' at the International Boat Show in Düsseldorf in 2015. The major diving organizations in Germany, including international organizations, have agreed to this declaration. This 'Eisenach Statement' contains the essential rules of conduct when diving (dive training) with children.

International standards equivalence

The International Organization for Standardization has approved six recreational diving standards that may be implemented worldwide (January 2007).

The listed standards developed by the (United States) RSTC are consistent with the applicable ISO Standards:

See also

References

External links

Underwater diving training organizations
Underwater diving procedures
Underwater diving safety